Knife legislation is defined as the body of statutory law or case law promulgated or enacted by a government or other governing jurisdiction that prohibits, criminalizes, or restricts the otherwise legal manufacture, importation, sale, transfer, possession, transport, or use of knives.

The carrying of knives in public is forbidden or restricted by law in many countries. Exceptions may be made for hunting knives, pocket knives, and knives used for work-related purposes (chef's knives, etc.), depending upon the laws of a given jurisdiction. In turn, the carrying or possessing of certain type of knives perceived as deadly or offensive weapons such as automatic or switchblade knives or butterfly knives (balisong knives) may be restricted or prohibited. Even where knives may be legally carried on the person generally, this right may not extend to all places and circumstances, and knives of any description may be prohibited at  schools, public buildings or courthouses, and at public events.

Austria

In accordance with the Austrian Arms Act of 1996 (Waffengesetz 1996) it is illegal to buy, import, possess or carry weapons that are disguised as another object or as an object of common use (sword canes, e.g., or knives disguised as ink pens, brush handles or belt buckles).  For ordinary knives, however, there are no restrictions or prohibitions based on blade length or opening or locking mechanism.

The Arms Act defines weapons as "objects that by their very nature are intended to reduce or eliminate the defensive ability of a person through direct impact", specifically including all firearms. Consequently, certain knives are considered "weapons" in accordance with this definition. Except for firearms, however, which are heavily regulated, such "weapons", including automatic opening lock-blade knives (switchblades), OTF automatic knives, butterfly knives, and gravity knives are implicitly permitted under the Arms Act, and thus may be bought, possessed and carried by anyone over the age of 18 who has not been expressively banned from owning any weapon (Waffenverbot) by the civilian authorities.

Belgium

Article 3, §1 of the 2006 Weapons Act lists the switchblade or automatic knife (couteaux à cran d'arrêt et à lame jaillissante), as well as butterfly knives, throwing knives, throwing stars, and knives or blades that have the appearance of other objects (i.e. sword canes, belt buckle knives, etc.) as prohibited weapons.  In addition to specifically prohibited knives, the police and local jurisdictions have broad authority to prohibit the carrying or possession of a wide variety of knives, to include carriage inside a vehicle, if the owner cannot establish sufficient legal reason (motif légitime) for doing so, particularly in urban areas or at public events.  This discretion extends to even folding knives without a locking blade.

Bulgaria

Bulgarian weapon law is maintained on a yearly basis. It is called ZOBVVPI (Bulgarian: Закон за оръжията, боеприпасите, взривните вещества и пиротехническите изделия) and it covers ONLY the possession and usage of firearms (including gas and signal ones), and pellet or BB (Bulgarian: сачми) pneumatic guns. A state regulation on melee weapons of any kind does not exist, whether knives, swords, bats or electric devices. Neither there is a juridical definition on the terms "melee weapon" or "cold weapon" in any Bulgarian law. Hence it is absolutely legal to possess and carry a knife in Bulgaria without having to procure any reason for doing so. Concealed knife carry is OK, anywhere and anytime. Although there are no restrictions on the possession or carrying of any type of knives or swords, it is not widely accepted or considered appropriate to carry a knife openly in public places such as streets or public buildings, stores or restaurants. In urban areas, expect an instant check and hassle if a policeman sees you to openly carry a larger knife, even if you have legal right to do it. From a society point of view, the open carry of knives in Bulgaria is justified only on rural areas, when fishing or hunting, or when the knife serves as a tool in work activities, such as gardening. Some places like courts, banks, clubs, bars, etc. will deny you the access with any type of weapon (knives included) and most of them don't offer a safekeeping option. It is urban legend in Bulgaria that knives above  are illegal to carry on person, so expect the police to try to convince you give up the knife voluntarily, even if such measure is illegal. You should not give up your knife, instead state the purpose of "daily needs", "utility usage" or even "self-defense" for carrying and be clear that you haven't committed any crime. Insist the policeman to cite a law against you carrying a knife in public. Since there is not any such law in Bulgaria, police most likely will let you keep your knife and send you on your way with a "warning". If they insist or are further misbehaving, ask to contact their superior officer prior to giving up your knife or else you will not see it again. Actually, there are some random city councils which try to limit knife lengths above  with issuing acts, but these acts are all illegal and have no compliance force, because the councils serve only administrative functions and they don't have the jurisdiction to invent or impose laws of any kind. Remember that although very liberal in terms of knives (weapons) possession and carry, compared to many European countries, Bulgaria is not the place where you can defend yourself with deadly force. If the need for self-defense with a knife ever arises, consider it very carefully. Usually, courts often consider the armed self-defense as "unjustified" based on the Penal Code and the defending side ends up with an effective jail verdict, even if the cause (treat) for initiating self-defense is proven.

Canada

There is no law banning the carrying in public knives with sheaths, knives that take both hands to open and any knife with a fixed blade and certain non-prohibited folding knives, assuming they are not carried for a purpose dangerous to public peace or for the purpose of committing a criminal offense.

The Criminal Justice Act 1988 (Offensive Weapons) (Exemption) Order 1996 states restrictions to sales of knives to those under 16 does not apply to:
 folding pocket-knife if the cutting edge of its blade does not exceed 
These age restrictions in the Criminal Justice Act 1988 were increased to 18, effective from 1 October 2007, by the Violent Crime Reduction Act 2006.

In Scotland, the Violent Crime Reduction Act 2006 makes it an offence to sell knives to someone under 18 years of age (including any blade, razor blade, any bladed or pointed article, or any item made or adapted for causing personal injury).

Knives Act 1997

The Knives Act 1997 prohibits the sale of combat knives and restricts the marketing of knives as offensive weapons.

Prevention of Crime Act 1953

The Prevention of Crime Act 1953 prohibits the possession in any public place of an offensive weapon without lawful authority or reasonable excuse.  The term "offensive weapon" is defined as: "any article made or adapted for use to causing injury to the person, or intended by the person having it with him for such use".

Under the Prevention of Crime Act, otherwise 'exempt' knives carried for "good reason or lawful authority" may be still deemed illegal if authorities conclude the knife is being carried as an "offensive weapon". In recent years, the Prevention of Crime Act 1953 has been reinterpreted by police and public prosecutors, who have persuaded the courts to minimize exceptions to prosecution on the grounds that the defendant had "lawful authority or reasonable excuse" in order to apply the Act to a wide variety of cases. This new approach now includes prosecution of citizens who have admitted carrying a knife for the sole purpose of self-defence (in the eyes of the law, this is presently viewed as an admission that the defendant intends to use the knife as an "offensive weapon", albeit in a defensive manner, and in otherwise justifiable circumstances).  While the onus lies on the officer to prove offensive intent, prosecutors and courts have in the past taken the appearance and the marketing of a particular brand of knife into account when considering whether an otherwise legal knife was being carried as an offensive weapon. In addition, the Knives Act 1997 now prohibits the sale of combat knives and restricts the marketing of knives as offensive weapons. A knife which is marketed as "tactical", "military", "special ops", etc. could therefore carry an extra liability.

The offense wording under Section 1 of the Prevention of Crime Act 1953 refers to 'causing injury to the person'. This opens a separate category of a self-defense tool that is intended and made for use against animals (e.g. Biteback dog spray), or a tool to be used against a person but not designed, intended or adapted to cause injury (e.g. a pressure point tool).

Proposals

While at his retirement ceremony in May 2018, Judge Nic Madge suggested at Luton Crown Court that members of the public could obtain or modify kitchen knives with rounded ends to be less dangerous. Judge Madge said if his proposals were implemented there would be a "substantial" reduction in the number of life-threatening injuries caused by stabbings.

A similar proposal was made in 2005 by three emergency medicine health professionals from West Middlesex University Hospital.

Case law

Case law in 2005 stated that even a butter knife can be classed as a bladed article in a public place.

Scotland

In Scotland, the Criminal Law (Consolidation) (Scotland) Act 1995 prevents the carrying of offensive weapons as well as pointed or bladed articles in a public place without lawful authority or reasonable excuse. Defences exist to a charge of possessing a bladed or pointed article in a public place when carried for use at work, as part of a national costume or for religious reasons. As in England and Wales, an exception is allowed for folding pocket knives which have a blade of less than 

Other relevant Scotland knife legislation includes the Criminal Justice Act 1988 (Offensive Weapons Act) (Scotland) Order 2005, which bans sword canes, push daggers, butterfly knives, throwing stars, knives that can defeat metal detectors, and knives disguised as other objects, and the Police, Public Order and Criminal Justice (Scotland) Act 2006, which makes it an offence to sell a knife, knife blade, or bladed or pointed object to a person under eighteen years of age, unless the person is sixteen or older and the knife or blade is "designed for domestic use." In 2007, the Custodial Sentences and Weapons (Scotland) Act 2007 allowed exemption from criminal liability under section 141 of the Criminal Justice Act 1988 for selling a prohibited offensive weapon if the sale was made for purposes of theatrical performances and of rehearsals for such performances, the production of films (as defined in section 5B of the Copyright, Designs and Patents Act 1988), or the production of television programmes (as defined in section 405(1) of the Communications Act 2003).

Under the Custodial Sentences and Weapons (Scotland) Act 2007 (in force since 10 September 2007), the Civic Government (Scotland) Act 1982 was amended and it was made compulsory to possess a local authority licence to sell knives, swords and blades (other than those designed for 'domestic use'), or to sell any sharply pointed or bladed object "which is made or adapted for use for causing injury to the person."  Any dealer in non-domestic knives will be required to hold a 'knife dealer's licence'.

Northern Ireland

The laws restricting knife ownership, use, possession and sale are nearly identical to the laws of Scotland and the rest of the UK, though contained in different acts.  In 2008, in response to a surge in public concern over knife-related crimes, Northern Ireland doubled the prison sentence for persons convicted of possessing a knife deemed to be an offensive weapon in a public place to four years' imprisonment, and added an evidential presumption in favour of prosecution for possession of a knife.

United States

Federal laws

Under the Switchblade Knife Act of 1958 (amended 1986, codified at 15 U.S.C. §§1241–1245), switchblades and ballistic knives are banned from interstate shipment, sale, or importation, or possession within the following: any territory or possession of the United States, i.e., land belonging to the U.S. federal government; Indian lands (as defined in section 1151 of title 18); and areas within the maritime or territorial jurisdiction of the federal government, except for federal, state law enforcement agencies and the military.  In addition, federal laws may prohibit the possession or carry of any knife on certain federal properties such as courthouses or military installations. U.S. federal laws on switchblades do not apply to the possession or sale of switchblade knives within a state's boundaries; the latter is regulated by the laws of that particular state if any.

Occasional disputes over what constitutes a switchblade knife under federal law have occasionally resulted in U.S. Customs seizures of knives from U.S. importers or manufacturers.  In one case, the seizure of a shipment of Columbia River Knife & Tool knives resulted in an estimated US$1 million loss to the company before the shipment was released.

Amendment 1447 to the Switchblade Knife Act (15 U.S.C. §1244), signed into law as part of the FY2010 Homeland Security Appropriations Bill on October 28, 2009, provides that the Act shall not apply to spring-assist or assisted-opening knives (i.e., knives with closure-biased springs that require physical force applied to the blade to assist in opening the knife).

State and local laws

Each state also has laws that govern the legality of carrying weapons, either concealed or openly, and these laws explicitly or implicitly cover various types of knives. Some states go beyond this and criminalize the mere possession of certain types of knives. Other states prohibit the possession or the concealed carrying of knives that feature blade styles or features sufficient to transform them into "dangerous weapons" or "deadly weapons", i.e., knives either optimized for lethality against humans or designed for and readily capable of causing death or serious bodily injury.  These frequently include knives with specific blade styles with a historical connection to violence or assassination, including thrusting knives such as the dirk, poignard, and stiletto, the bowie knife, and double-edged knives with crossguards designed for knife fighting such as the dagger.  Some states make the carrying or possession of any dangerous or deadly weapon with intent to unlawfully harm another a crime.

Summaries of every state knife law are available from handgun law websites.

Historical origin

The origin of many knife laws, particularly in the southern states, comes from attempts by early state legislatures to curtail the practice of knife fighting and dueling with large knives such as the bowie knife, which was commonly carried as an item of personal defense prior to the invention of the revolver.  In Alabama, Mississippi, New Mexico, and Virginia, the carrying on one's person of large and lengthy fighting knives capable of causing grievous wounds such as the Bowie knife is prohibited by statute, originally in the interest of controlling or eliminating the then-common practice of dueling, a term which had degenerated from a rarely used social custom into a generalized description for any knife or gun fight between two contestants.  In many jurisdictions, a local tradition of using knives to settle differences or for self-defense resulted in the enactment of statutes that restricted the size and length of the knife and, particularly, the length of its blade.

After the Civil War, many restrictions on knife and even gun ownership were imposed by state, county, and city laws and ordinances that were clearly based on fear of weapon possession by certain racial groups, particularly African-American and Hispanic Americans.  In some states, so-called "Black Codes" adopted after the Civil War required Black People to obtain a license before carrying or possessing firearms or Bowie knives.  The governments of Texas and other former states of the Confederacy, many of which had recognized the right to carry arms such as Bowie knives openly before the Civil War, passed new restrictions on both gun and knife possession and use.  In some cases, these laws were directed at formerly enslaved people and other minorities; in other cases, by reconstruction legislatures anxious to disarm rebellious militias and groups seeking to disenfranchise African-American and other minorities.  The April 12, 1871 law passed by Texas' Reconstruction legislature is typical, and is the ancestor of the present law restricting knife possession and use in Texas:

While most gun restrictions were eventually repealed, many knife laws remained in effect in the South. In Texas, this was largely explained by the presence of large numbers of Tejanos.   By 1870, Texas whites of the day had almost universally and exclusively adopted the revolver for self-defense, while Tejanos, steeped in the blade culture (el legado Andaluz) of Mexico and Spain and generally without the means to purchase handguns, continued to carry knives.  Thus, while local and state Texas gun laws and ordinances were gradually relaxed or eliminated during the late 1800s, the old prohibitions against bowie knives, daggers, dirks, and other long-bladed knives remained on the books since they served to disarm and control a minority group viewed as engaging in lawless behaviors and violence without legal justification.  The Texas law remained on the books for almost 150 years, until modified in 2017 to allow carrying these weapons with some restrictions.

Interpreting current state laws

Many of today's state criminal codes restricting knife use and ownership have been amended repeatedly over the years rather than rewritten to remove old classifications and definitions that are largely a historical legacy. This process frequently results in illogical, confusing, and even conflicting provisions. Thus in Arkansas, a state in which knife fights using large, lengthy blades such as the Bowie and Arkansas toothpick were once commonplace, a state statute made it illegal for someone to "carry a knife as a weapon", specifying that any knife with a blade  or longer constituted prima facie evidence that the knife was being carried as a weapon, yet allowed a complete exemption to the law when "upon a journey".

While Arkansas eventually repealed its archaic criminal knife possession law, other states still periodically amend archaic criminal codes that penalize historical and present-day behavior involving knife use and ownership; these patchwork statutes can result in lengthy legal disputes over legislative intent and definitions.  As one example, Indiana law makes it illegal to possess a "dagger, dirk, poniard, stiletto, switchblade knife, or gravity knife" on school property, or to possess any knife on school property "capable of being used to inflict cutting, stabbing, or tearing wounds" if that knife "is intended to be used as a weapon", but provides for a criminal penalty only if a person "recklessly, knowingly, or intentionally" possesses such a knife on school property.  The statute thus requires 1) an examination of the knife and the legislative history of the statute; 2) expert testimony on the individual characteristics of historic knife designs to determine whether the knife in question fits within one of the six specified categories of a knife; 3) a determination as to whether the blade can cause a "cutting, stabbing, or tearing wound"; 4) a determination as to what degree of injury constitutes a "wound", and 5) two separate determinations of the defendant's intent by the fact finder – before guilt or innocence may be adjudged.

Some states prohibit the possession of a folding knife with a quick-opening mechanism such as a gravity knife, butterfly knife, or switchblade.  Other states may impose no restrictions at all,  while many allow possession with some restrictions (age, carrying on one's person, carrying concealed, carrying while a convicted felon, prohibited possessor, or while in the commission of a serious offense, etc.)

The continual advent of new knife designs, such as assisted-opening knives can complicate issues of legality, particularly when state laws have not been carefully drafted to clearly define the new design and how it is to be classified within existing law. This omission has led in the past to cases in which state courts have substituted their own understanding of knife design to interpret legislative intent when applying statutes criminalizing certain types of knives.

In 2014, attention was brought by many newspapers and media outlets to 1950s era legislation leading to many arrests and convictions for possession of the loosely defined gravity knife. This law was later declared unconstitutionally vague and subsequently repealed.

City, county, and local laws

City, county, and local jurisdictions (to include sovereign Indian nations located within a state boundary) may enact their own criminal laws or ordinances in addition to the restrictions contained in state laws, which may be more restrictive than state law.  Virtually all states and local jurisdictions have laws that restrict or prohibit the possession or carrying of knives in some form or manner in certain defined areas or places such as schools, public buildings, courthouses, police stations, jails, power plant facilities, airports, or public events.

Local or city ordinances are sometimes drafted to include specific classes of people not covered by the state criminal codes, such as individuals carrying folding knives with locking blades primarily for use as weapons. The San Antonio ordinance allows police to charge persons carrying most types of lock blade knives without good cause with a criminal misdemeanor violation, allowing police to remove the knife from the possession of the offender, while providing exemptions from the ordinance designed to protect certain classes of people the city assumes to pose no threat to public order. This ordinance was negated in 2015 when Texas adopted a statewide law preempting any expansion of state knife law by local government entities. Occasionally, city and county ordinances conflict with state law. In one example, the city of Portland, Oregon initially passed a city ordinance banning all pocket knives,  until the measure was overturned by the Oregon Supreme Court as conflicting with state criminal statutes.

Constitutional protection 

The constitutional status of knives as being protected arms under the Second Amendment (or state analogs to the Second Amendment) is currently being litigated in light of recent Supreme Court rulings.  In the landmark ruling New York Pistol & Rifle Association v. Bruen (2022), a wide definition is accepted: "Thus, even though the Second Amendment’s definition of “arms” is fixed according to its historical understanding, that general definition covers modern instruments that facilitate armed self-defense."

The California Court of Appeal ruled in People v. Mitchell (2012) that prohibiting the concealed carrying of a dirk or dagger is constitutional.

The Connecticut Supreme Court ruled in State v. DeCiccio (2014) that the Second Amendment protects dirk knives and police batons.

The Delaware Supreme Court ruled in Griffin v. State (2012) that carrying a concealed knife in one's home is constitutionally protected.

The Indiana Court of Appeals ruled in Lacy v. State (2009) that possession of a knife with an automatic opening blade is not constitutionally protected.

The New Jersey Supreme Court ruled in State v. Lee (1984) that a statute prohibiting a person who knowingly possesses a weapon other than certain firearms "under circumstances not manifestly appropriate for such lawful uses as it may have is guilty of a crime of the fourth degree" is constitutional and that "intent to use for an unlawful purpose" is not an element of the offense; State v. Wright (1984) that being prosecuted for strapping a knife to one's leg was justified; State v. Blaine (1987) that walking in public with a pocket knife in one's pocket is insufficient for conviction; State v. Riley (1997) that carrying, but not displaying or brandishing, a pocket knife is insufficient for conviction; State v. Montalvo (2017) that possession of a machete in the home for self defense is constitutionally protected.

The New Mexico Court of Appeals ruled in State v. Murillo (2015) that switchblades are not constitutionally protected.

The Ohio Court of Appeals ruled in Akron v.

The Oregon Supreme Court ruled in State v. Kessler (1980) and State v. Blocker (1981) that prohibiting the possession of a billy club is unconstitutional; applying the same logic, the court ruled in State v. Delgado (1984) that prohibiting the possession and carrying of switchblades is also unconstitutional; and also applied the same to blackjacks in Barnett v. State (1985).

The Washington Supreme Court ruled in City of Seattle v. Montana and McCullough (1996) that kitchen knives are not constitutionally protected; City of Seattle v. Evans (2015) that some knives may be protected, but paring knives are not.

The Wisconsin Court of Appeals ruled in State v. Herrmann (2015) that prohibiting possession of a switchblade in the home is unconstitutional.

See also

Weapon possession (crime)
Self-defense
Offensive weapon

References

External links
Collection of laws in Europe

Statutory law
Knives